Renuka, also known as Yellamma, is a Hindu goddess worshipped predominantly in the South Indian states of Karnataka, Tamil Nadu, Telangana, Kerala, Andhra Pradesh and western state of Maharashtra. She is also known as the mother of Parashurama, the sixth avatar of the god Vishnu. Originally a Dravidian folk deity, she acquired the status of a mother goddess before eventually being associated with the legend of Parashurama.

Names
Renuka is venerated by a number of different appellations such as Yellamma, Ekvira, Ellai Amman, Padmakshi Renuka, and Ellai Amma Mahar, Kannada: ಶ್ರೀ ಯಲ್ಲಮ್ಮ ರೇಣುಕಾ, (Marathi: श्री. रेणुका / येल्लुआई, Tamil: ரேணு/ரேணுகை அம்மன், Telugu: శ్రీ రేణుక/ ఎల్లమ్మ) and is worshipped as the goddess of the fallen in the Hindu pantheon. Her devotees revere her as the "Mother of the universe" or Jagadamba. 

Other names for Yellamma include Mariamma, Chaniamma, Gangamma, and Kariyamma.

Legends
The legends of Renuka are contained in the Mahabharata, the Harivamsa, and in the Bhagavata Purana.

There are 4 incarnations of Adi parashakti ( Kamakshi) is worshipped. Vishalakshi in North, Renukakshi (Padmakshi) in West, Meenakshi in South and Bahulakshi in East.

Early life
King Renu (father of Renuka) performed a yajna — a ritual performed to maintain peace and good health. He was blessed with a daughter, who originated from the fire of this yajna. Renuka was a bright and active child and became the most beloved child of her parents.

When she was eight, Agastya,  the guru of King Reṇu, advised him to have his daughter married to Jamadagni when she reached maturity. Jamadagni was the son of Ruchika and Satyavati and had obtained the blessings of the gods by performing severe penance. Renuka helped the Jamdagni in all of his tasks of performing various rituals and puja. After a while, Renuka was blessed with another daughter called Anjana. Renuka would wake up early in the morning to bathe in the Malaprabha River with complete concentration and devotion. Her devotion was so powerful that she was able to create a pot to hold water made only of sand, one fresh pot every day. She would fill this pot on the bank of the river and would use a snake which was nearby, turning it into a rope-like convolution and placing it on her head, so that it supported the pot. Thus, she brought the water to Jamdagni for his rituals of oblation.

Married Life
Renuka gave birth to five sons: Ṛumaṇvān, Suhotra, Vasu, Viśvāvasu, and Rama Bhargava. Rama Bhargava was the youngest and most beloved, gaining the favour of Shiva and Parvati. Rama performed severe penance and was bestowed with an axe (parashu), and was henceforth called as Parashurama (the sixth incarnation of Vishnu). One day, when Renuka went to the river, she saw a king make love to his wives. She was captivated by the sight, as a result of which she lost her concentration and devotion to her husband for a moment.  As she was distracted, she lost her power of collecting water in unbaked pots, which she had gotten from her chastity. She lost the water that she had collected. Disappointed by this, she returned to the ashram in worry. Jamadagni had seen these events through his yogic power and was furious when she came back to the ashram.

After being cursed by her husband, Renuka went east and sat in the forest to meditate. In her penance, she met with the saints Eknath  and Joginath; and requested them to gain the mercy of her husband. They first consoled her and then instructed her to follow their advice exactly as told. They told her to purify herself, first bathing in a nearby lake, and then to worship a Shivalinga, which they had given to her. Next, she was asked to visit the nearby town and beg for rice from the houses (this ritual, called "Joga Bedodu", is still carried out by women during a particular month in Karnataka/ "Jogawa" in Marathi, "Yellamma Jogu" in Telangana).

After collecting the rice, she was to give half to the saints and cook the remaining half, adding jaggery, partaking of the cooked rice with full devotion. They said that if she performed this ritual for three days, she would be able to visit her husband on the fourth day.

Knowing the anger of Jamadagni, they warned her that she may not be fully pardoned by him and that she would have to experience the most difficult time of her life for a few minutes. "After that," they said, "you will be eternally revered and will be blessed with your husband. You will be worshipped by all the people henceforth." After blessing her thus, they disappeared. Renuka followed their instructions with devotion and worshipped the Shivalinga with reverence. On the fourth day, she went to see her husband.

Decapitation and Resurrection 
Jamadagni was still furious with Renuka and ordered his elder four sons to kill his wife, but all of them refused to kill their mother. Jamadagni cursed his four sons and reduced them to ashes for disobeying his order. Then, Jamadagni called his fifth son Parashurama, who was meditating on Shiva, and ordered him to behead Renuka. Parashurama immediately obeyed his father's words and beheaded his mother with his axe. Jamadagni was pleased by Parashurama's devotion and obedience towards him.

He then offered a boon to Parushurama, who wisely asked for his mother and brothers to be brought back to life. Jamadagni was impressed by Parshuram's pragmatism and brought Renuka and her four sons back to life. Jamadagni felt strong remorse for what he had done to his beloved and compassionate wife. He then vowed not to get angered ever again and gave up krodha forever.

Renuka's Head 
According to a version of the tale, Renuka fled to the locale of a lower-caste community, hoping that her Brahmin son would not consent to follow her and execute her due to his high caste. However, the obedient Parashurama cast aside his discomfort and swung his axe, beheading both his mother and a lower-caste woman who had risen to obstruct his matricide. When Parashurama asked his boon of restoring his mother, Jamadagni offered him a magical pot of water that had to be sprinkled upon the head attached to the body of his mother. In his excitement, Parashurama accidentally fused the head of the lower-caste woman he had slain with the body of his mother, which both his father and he had to accept. The head of the high-caste Renuka was left behind in the community, retained as a shrine for the veneration of Renuka-Yellamma.

Temples and Related places

One of the famous temples of Renuka Yellamma Thalli is located at Balkampet in Hyderabad where every year in Ashadha month Yellamma Kalyanothsavam is celebrated with thousands of pilgrims performing special rituals to get the blessings of Renuka Yellamma Thalli. The Murti of the goddess, interestingly, is 10 feet deeper than the ground level. There is also a well in the Balkampet Yellamma temple complex and some devotees believe that the water in the well heals all ills. Taking a bath here is supposed to purify one of all disorders and skin diseases. This holy water is called ‘tirtham’. An Akhand Jyoti is also present in the temple that was lit during the renovation.

Every year, there is a gathering of 200,000 to 600,000 devotees at the Yellamma Gudi temple (Yellamma Temple) in Saundatti

Three other very famous Temples of Renuka Yellamma are located in Mandapaka/Tanuku, West Godavari district, Andhra Pradesh, Bidarahalli, Gadag, and Chandragutti, Shimoga, Karnataka, India. Many devotees from different regions come to the temple in the month of Kartik and revere Renuka-Yellamma. It is believed that after her marriage with the sage Jamadagni, Renuka lived in this place. Renuka used to wake up early in the morning and bathe in the holy Tungabhadra River. With complete concentration and devotion to fill the pot, which she used to prepare out of the sand on the bank of the river and would hold the snake which was there and turn it into a convolution and place it on the head so that it supported the pot. She bought the pot to Jamdagni for the performance of rituals.

There is a famous temple in Kavade Village of Alibag of Renuka Devi named "Padmakshi Renuka Devi", where people also call her "Aai mauli". She is also known as Kali, Bhairavi, Amba, Ekvira. Her sister is known as Jogeshwari. Her mount or Vahan is Vmshatki the animal made of 20 Guna. She is a newly formed Shakti peeth and is one of 108 Shakti peeth. Goddess has been described as having very beautiful charm and glory on her face with a loving nature.   

Another temple Renukambe [Yellamma] is atop a hill in Chandragutti, Soraba Taluk in Shimoga. This temple is an example of ancient architecture and dates back to the Kadamba period. Another temple is in Mahur, Maharashtra, the supposed birthplace of the goddess, which finds mention in Devi Gita, the final chapter of Devi Bhagawatam as, "Matripura in the Sahyadri mountain; here the Devi Renuka dwells ...".

One of the temples of Renuka Devi is Chandwad in Nasik. The temple was constructed by her highness Maharani Ahilyabai Holkar of Indore. The second place is Matripura in the Sahyadrî mountains.

Another Temple of Devi is at Dhamnand-Posare, Taluka Khed, Maharashtra known as "Devi Yalubai". Another temple becoming famous is Nalgonda, Telangana where Tuesday is main auspicious day.

In Tamil Nadu, Renugambal Amman Temple (it is Kuladaivam for Jambu Maharishi (Jamadagini) gotra Vanniyars), Senguntha Muthaliyars and other communities' people tracing their origin in that locality. The temple is situated in Padavedu, Thiruvannamalai District and it is one of the most important Sakthi Sthalas, another temple is located at Manthangal village, Ranipet district, Tamilnadu. The presiding deity here is called Kondi Amman (worshipped by Pokanati Reddys settled from the Carnatic-Andhra regions)

Renuka Lake in the Renuka Sanctuary in Himachal Pradesh is named after the goddess. According to one legend, the Haihaya King Sahasrarjuna (Kartavirya Arjuna) wanted the Kamadhenu cow from Jamadagni and Renuka. So for this he killed Jamadagni, and Renuka became sati along with Jamadagni at Mahurgadh, Maharashtra.

Another famous temple for Renukambal is situated in Serampattu Village near Cheyyar in the Tiruvannamalai district. Thousands of people gather here during the Pongal festival. Another powerful temple of Renuka Parameshwari is located in Tiruchampalli near Sembanarkoil in the Nagapattinam district of Tamil Nadu.

One more temple of Ellamma is situated at the village of Ragupathi Naicken Palayam of Erode, Tamilnadu. Ragupathi Naicken Palayam can be reached from Erode - Poondurai Road as well as Erode - Vellode Road. Although it is unclear when the temple was constructed, it is understood from the inscription placed at the temple that the temple was renovated by the Late Mr. Duraisamy Naicker in 1923. He is said to belong to the community of Banajiga (or Balija) of Lingayat Society which has origin in Karnataka but settled in Tamilnadu in the 19th century. The temple is maintained by people of the Banajiga community now. Maha Shivratri in the month of Maasi and the Full Moon day of Karthigai are celebrated by the Banajigas in this temple.

Goddess Renuka and Lord Jamdagni Muni are worshipped in villages around Yamuna river in Rawain valley of Uttarkashi district in Uttaranchal. Many ancient temples in the region are dedicated to the divine couple – the famous being the Jamadagni temple at Thaan village near the bank of yamuna and Renuka temples in the uphill village of Devadokhri, Banchangaon, and Sarnaul. The region has an age-old tradition of celebrations in commemoration of the local deities, and managing the temple affairs and customs. The priesthood is claimed on the basis of ancestry and merit both, and mainly held by Khanduri, Semwal, and Dimri Brahmins of Uttaranchal.  The week-long annual festivities in the month of June are main attraction for devotees around the region.

See also
Chandragutti Renukamba Temple
Sirsi Marikamba Temple

Further reading
 The Village Gods of South India (London, 1921) by H. Whitehead
 Yellamma: A Goddess of South India (1995) by Channappa Uttangi
 Given to the Goddess: South Indian Devadasis and the Sexuality of Religion (2004) by Lucinda Ramberg

References

External links

Hindu goddesses
Characters in the Bhagavata Purana
Hindu folk deities
 
Characters in the Mahabharata